René Ménard (2 March 1605 – 4 July 1661?) was a French Jesuit missionary explorer who traveled to New France in 1641, learned the language of the Wyandot, and was soon in charge of many of the satellite missions around Sainte-Marie among the Hurons. Ménard also worked with the Iroquois, and was said to speak six Indian dialects. He survived the continuous attacks from the Iroquois on the Huron.

Biography
René Ménard was born in Paris on 2 March 1605. He joined the Jesuits there on 7 September 1624. After the usual course of studies at La Flèche, Bourges, and Orleans, he set out from Dieppe in the beginning of May 1640. Arriving at Québec he was assigned to work among the Hurons, laboring first, however, among the Nippissings. From 1651 to 1656 he was the superior at Trois-Rivières. From 1656 to 1658 he was a missioner to the Cayuga, and later to the Oneida.

In 1660, Ménard was sent west from Montreal with a trading party of Ottawa and the fur traders Radisson and Groseilliers, heading for what is now northern Wisconsin, aiming to establish a mission among the Ottawa. The 55-year-old Ménard didn't expect to return. The night before departure he wrote to a friend,

Leaving Trois-Rivières, Québec at the end of August, they paddled for six weeks up the St. Lawrence, up the Ottawa River, and across Georgian Bay. The party didn't go easy on the frail Father. Separated from the French traders and his assistant, he was forced to paddle continuously and carry heavy loads with meager rations. When they passed Sault Ste. Marie into Lake Superior, Father Ménard had penetrated further into the Great Lakes region than any Western official before. After his party's canoe was destroyed by a falling tree in mid-October, Ménard wintered with some Ottawas at Keweenaw Bay near what is now L'Anse, Michigan. He sheltered in a hut he made of tree branches and at times he subsisted on fish begged from the Indians and boiled moss. Despite the hardships and resistance from many Indians, he baptized and taught the Christian faith.

In the spring he heard that a band of Hurons in the interior was starving, and he set off to minister to them, though he himself had only a bag of sturgeon and some dried meat. He and a fur trader nicknamed L'Esperance walked and canoed down into what is believed to be present-day Taylor County in north central Wisconsin. At a rapids a day's journey from the Huron village, Ménard, now weak with hunger himself, became separated from his companion, and disappeared. His cassock and breviary were later found among the Dakotas.  

Bishop Laval of Québec wrote of Ménard and the fur traders, "Seven Frenchmen attached themselves to this Apostle, they to catch beavers, he to gain souls."

A roadside sign in Iron County, Michigan, along the Michigamme River claims Father Ménard died there on 4 July 1661. A granite monument in Lincoln County, Wisconsin, indicates that he disappeared while portaging around Bill Cross Rapids in the nearby Wisconsin River.

See also
 Black Robe, a novel that portrays the world through which Ménard moved
 List of people who disappeared

References

External links
 René Menard: A Life Story Which Connects the Finger Lakes Region of New York with France, Québec, Georgian Bay and Wisconsin by Alexander McGinn Stewart
 The Wisconsin Journey by Kurt Leichtle
 "The Jesuit Relations and Allied Documents: Travels and Explorations of the Jesuit Missionaries in New France 1610-1791" Chapter VIII describes Menard's final mission.

1605 births
1661 deaths
17th-century French Jesuits
Clergy from Paris
Explorers of Canada
Explorers from Paris
French Roman Catholic missionaries
Jesuit missionaries in New France
Missing person cases in Wisconsin
People of pre-statehood Michigan
People of pre-statehood Wisconsin